Charles Harding Loring (December 26, 1828 – February 5, 1907) was a U.S. Navy admiral and chief engineer.

Early life 
Loring was born on December 26, 1828, and is descended from two Pilgrim forefathers. His father was William Price Loring, who was born in Boston in 1795, and who was in early life a silversmith, and afterwards served as an officer of the customs. He was also an early California pioneer, where he remained until within a few years of his death, which occurred in Boston in 1878. His mother, whose maiden name was Eliza Harding, was born in Haverhill, Massachusetts, in 1800 and bore her husband four daughters and two sons.

Navy career 
As his educational period was before the day of technical schools, he followed the usual course of preparation for mechanical engineering and served a regular apprenticeship in the machine shop with Jabez Coney. At its close, in 1851, he entered the United States Navy as a third assistant engineer, attaining, by competitive examination, the highest place in a class of 14.

His entrance was just too late to give him an opportunity for participation in the Mexican–American War, and by the time the American Civil War broke out he had passed through all the junior grades and had become a chief engineer. During his service in junior grades he had been laying the foundation for his more important work when an older man and in higher positions, a portion of his shore duty having been as assistant to the engineer-in-chief of the Navy, in which capacity he had charge of the experimental work and tests of engineering devices coming before that office. While engaged in this duty he made a test of the first injector which came to this country.

Civil War 
During the Civil War he was in active service the whole time, and during the first 18 months was fleet engineer of the North Atlantic Squadron, being attached to the steamer .

A little later he was detached from sea duty and sent to Cincinnati, Ohio, to supervise the construction of three river and harbor monitors and also of some light-draught sea monitors building there. Subsequently, he was made general inspector of all the iron-clad steamers building west of the Allegheny Mountains, having in charge at one time 11 monitors building at Pittsburgh, Cincinnati, and St. Louis.

During the Civil War a number of excellent engines had been accumulated for hulls which were in process of construction, but with the close of the war all work was stopped, and after a time a board was appointed to recommend the best disposition of these engines which were stored in the various navy yards. It was about this time that the compound engine was coming into general use, and the same board was directed to make a study of the compound engine with a view to its introduction in naval vessels. Of this board, Loring was senior member, and associated with him was Chief Engineer Charles Hinckley Baker.

Study of compound engines 
After a very exhaustive study of the subject, they recommended the introduction of compound engines and the abandonment of the simple form, and the conversion of a number of the engines which were on hand into compound engines. The tests of these engines were very satisfactory and showed a coal economy for short runs of not much over two pounds of coal per horsepower hour.

These tests were the first of the kind conducted under circumstances of entire reliability, with the result that the report of the trials was republished all over the world and is still quoted in all the text books on steam engineering.

Fleet engineering 
There was nothing especially eventful in this cruise, and at its end, in 1880, he was assigned as the head of the steam engineering department of the New York Navy Yard.

This was the period of greatest inactivity in the history of the Navy, and there was little to do, even for a very active man, except routine work. During this tour, however. Loring was senior member of a board that made a test of the machinery of the Anthracite, a little yacht with a triple-expansion engine working with 600 pounds pressure. The experiments were valuable as showing that, with the form of apparatus on board the Anthracite, there was no such gain in economy as to warrant the tremendous pressure carried, while it involved numerous practical difficulties.

In 1881, he was a member of what is known as the First Naval Advisory Board, appointed by Secretary William H. Hunt to formulate a shipbuilding program for the Navy which he might submit to Congress. The personnel of this advisory board was distinguished in all its branches, and the work they did made possible our splendid fleet of today, as they definitely decided to abandon wooden hulls for those of iron and steel, and for general progress in every respect. In 1882, he was a member of another important board known as the Navy Yard Board, of which Admiral Stephen Luce was senior member. The duty of this board was to visit all the navy yards of the country for the purpose of determining which of them might with advantage and economy be closed. It was a delicate task, but the report, when finally approved, gave general satisfaction, and its recommendations were carried out.

Bureau of Steam Engineering 
On the retirement of the engineer-in-chief, William H. Shock, only two successors were thought of, one of whom was Loring, and his merit and thorough qualification for the position were so well recognized that the appointment came to him entirely unsought. This was in 1884, during the administration of President Chester A. Arthur.

Part of the scheme of building the new navy was the organization of what was known as an advisory board, composed of two civilians and a number of naval officers. Owing to this regime the bureaus were not given the same free hand that has obtained since the advisory board was discontinued, although they did valuable work in the details of designs. Forced draft was used on these new vessels, after having been tried on two others—the Alliance and Swatara—under Loring's direction.

In 1885, with the advent of a new administration, there was a general spirit of unrest about the Navy Department from what seemed to be a prevailing belief that whatever was, was wrong. The air was filled with rumors of intended changes, among them one which promised to cause a violation of the contract labor law, as it was actually seriously under consideration to import a British engineer and put him in charge of the design of machinery. From this intent and other indications it became evident to Loring that he did not enjoy the Secretary's confidence, and he tendered his resignation.

After leaving the Bureau of Steam Engineering he was made senior member of the Experimental Board of Naval Officers at the New York Navy Yard, which board, under his direction, conducted many exceedingly valuable experiments. Among the most important were the competitive tests of water-tube boilers to determine the type that should be used on the coast-defence vessel , and it may be well here to call attention to the fact that this was the first case on record where a boiler had ever been run for 24 hours when burning more than 50 pounds of coal per square foot of grate.

Another very important series of experiments conducted by Loring were those on the boilers of the torpedo boat , to determine the economy of evaporation with different air pressures and rates of combustion. These experiments have proven of the greatest interest, and form a very valuable collection of engineering data. A number of clever devices had to be schemed out to carry on these tests, and the whole success was a great credit to Loring and the board.

Retirement 
Having reached the age limit in December 1890, he was placed on the retired list; but having always been a man of very vigorous physique, he did not give up active employment and was for a time consulting engineer to the United States and Brazil Mail Steamship Company. During the Spanish–American War he was recalled to active duty and assigned as inspector of engineering work in New York City.

This record shows the active naval work of Loring, but to those who knew him well, this side of his character was less important than the social one. Although a man of great dignity, he was what is now called "a good mixer," being most companionable and a delightful associate. He wrote well and was a good speaker, but he was perhaps at his best in a party of moderate size where his keen sense of humor, his genial personality and his remarkable skill as a raconteur made him a most enjoyable associate.

He was for two years president of the Engineers' Club of New York, which is a sure test of popularity and wide acquaintance in the engineering world. He was also president of the American Society of Mechanical Engineers, the highest honor which his branch of the profession could confer. He was a vice-president of the Society of Naval Architects and Marine Engineers from its formation until his death, and, as long as his health permitted, was very active in its council and general meetings. He was a member of our own Society from the beginning. He had also been very active in the Army and Navy Club of New York, filling various offices and acting as its secretary for several years. Lording succumbed to an attack of paralysis.

Loring's career covered almost the whole period of progress in marine engineering from the side-wheel engine and box boilers down to the triple-expansion engine and steam turbine, forced draft and the water-tube boiler. In nearly all of this progress he played an important part, and he could justly feel that he had not only done his duty but had been a factor in the continued advancement of the profession and the service he loved so well.

Footnotes

Bibliography

External links 
 

1828 births
1907 deaths
19th-century American naval officers
American engineers
People from Boston
People of Massachusetts in the American Civil War
Union Navy officers
United States Navy engineering officers